Salebriaria engeli, or Engel's salebriarium, is a species of pyralid moth in the family Pyralidae.

The MONA or Hodges number for Salebriaria engeli is 5773.

References

Further reading

External links

 

Phycitini
Moths described in 1906